David Amako Monsoh (born June 26, 1973), known as David Monsoh is an Ivorian record producer the founder of Obouo Productions and the Co-founder of Black in France and Africa. He is the origin of the success by most famous African musicians including Nayanka Bell, and many more.

Biography 
David was born on June 26, 1973 from a family of twenty children In early 1990 he met his sister Nayanka Bell in Agboville High School from Abidjan who helped David go to France to pursue high school studies at Saint-Gabriel High School in Bagneux, near Paris. He did Bachelor of Tourism Studies (BTS) and recreation in a marketing school in Paris, at the same time Monsoh worked as a trainer in (SLP film) production company headed by Pascal Leibel who was the husband of Nayanka Bell. In 1989 David met Ivorian singer Gadji Celi who was a former soccer player of Ivory Coast national football team. as they collaborate together and David produce his first Album Espoir that was released in 1994. and it was the first success for Monsoh. from 1994 to 2004, Monsoh becomes the first African Director and Manager of the Paris distribution company Sono Disc. he produced many artists including Fally Ipupa, Koffi Olomide, DJ Arafat, Magic System, Gadji Céli and many more.

In 2002, he founded Obouo Productions refereed as Obouo Media Audio & Visual production company that signed contracts with many artists including Héritier Watanabe. In 2003 he became the founding president of BBlack television in Africa. It was officially launched in December and it offers news, movies, music and many more programs. In between August and September 2014, David was the President of the Africa Island Talent Jury, a program sponsored by Universal Music Group. His role was to discover new talent in Africa. Then in 1995, David Monsoh meets the legendary Congolese singer Koffi Olomide who was already a big star in Africa. They met and did business together, David produce two of his albums, Effrakata in 2002 and Affaire d'État in 2003. By his courage and hard-working David got promoted as the best seller of records in African and he became the executive producer.

See also 

 Magic System
 DJ Arafat
 Nayanka Bell

Discography

Albums

External links 
 DAVID MONSOH : Boss de l’entertainment
 David Monsoh Biography
 OBOUO Music

References 

Living people
1973 births
Ivorian producers
Ivorian music
People from Abidjan